The Maryland and Pennsylvania Railroad , familiarly known as the "Ma and Pa", was an American short-line railroad between York and Hanover, Pennsylvania, formerly operating passenger and freight trains on its original line between York and Baltimore, Maryland, from 1901 until the 1950s. The Ma and Pa was popular with railfans in the 1930s and 1940s for its antique equipment and curving, picturesque right-of-way through the hills of rural Maryland and Pennsylvania.

Passenger service was discontinued on August 31, 1954, and the section from Baltimore to Whiteford, Maryland (just south of the Mason-Dixon line demarcating the Pennsylvania-Maryland border) was abandoned in June 1958. Most of the remaining original railroad line was abandoned by 1984. The Maryland and Pennsylvania Railroad acquired a former  Pennsylvania Railroad (PRR) branch line between York and Hanover in 1976, now operated by a successor corporation, York Railway.

History

19th-century predecessors
The Maryland and Pennsylvania Railroad was formed from two earlier 19th-century 3 ft (914 mm) narrow gauge railways: the Baltimore & Delta Railway, later the Baltimore and Lehigh Railway, and the York and Peach Bottom Railway, later the York Southern Railroad. Construction of the Baltimore & Delta Railway started in 1881, and passenger trains between Baltimore and Towson, Maryland, began on April 17, 1882. Later that year the company was merged into the Maryland Central Railroad. The line was extended northward to Bel Air, Maryland on June 21, 1883, and the following January, the line was completed to Delta, Pennsylvania.

In Pennsylvania, the Peach Bottom Railway was incorporated in 1871. The railway's Middle Division laid narrow gauge track between York and Red Lion by August 1874 and completed its line southward to Delta in 1876. It went bankrupt in 1881 and was reorganized as the York and Peach Bottom Railway (Y&PB) in 1882. The Y&PB merged with the Maryland Central Railway (successor to the Maryland Central RR) in 1891, becoming the Baltimore and Lehigh, and the new company operated trains on the combined track between York and Baltimore.

Both railroads struggled with light freight traffic and financial difficulties in the 1890s. Because of their narrow gauge construction, the Baltimore and Lehigh Railway and York Southern Railroad could not interchange freight cars with other lines. The two companies finally converted to standard gauge between 1898–1900 and subsequently merged to form the Maryland and Pennsylvania Railroad on February 12, 1901. The result was the circuitous,  "Ma and Pa" route between Baltimore and York, compared to the competing Pennsylvania Railroad's more direct  distance between the two cities on its Northern Central Railway division.

20th century

Following the merger, the Ma and Pa operated through passenger and freight trains between York and Baltimore, as well as local trains at each end of the line, hauling mail and express, slate, marble, anthracite coal, lumber, furniture, and agricultural products to market. Particularly on the Pennsylvania Division (Delta–York), slate from Delta and manufactured goods from Red Lion and York were mainstays of the railroad's outbound freight traffic in the early years. On the Maryland Division, inbound anthracite coal deliveries accounted for a significant volume of carloadings, along with milk from the many dairy farms in the area. One early morning train from Fallston boarded more than 1,100 gallons of milk daily and was dubbed the "Milky Way". The line was profitable and traffic volume was such that additional locomotives were necessary. The Ma and Pa acquired two 0-6-0 Baldwin switchers in 1913, #29 and #30 (pictured), called "jewels of engines, in some respects the most attractive the road had", by writer George Hilton in The Ma & Pa – A History of the Maryland & Pennsylvania Railroad. The next year, three 2-8-0 "Consolidations" by Baldwin were added to the roster, providing more powerful locomotives for the Baltimore–York through freights. At its peak, the railroad had 16 locomotives and 160 pieces of rolling stock, with 573 employees.

With increasing competition from trucks and automobiles in the 1920s, passenger volume began to decline along with less-than-carload freight, such as milk from the many dairy farms along the Ma and Pa's pastoral route. The Ma and Pa substituted more economical, self-propelled gas-electric passenger cars for steam-powered passenger trains in 1927–1928. Carload freight volume increased in the 1920s, however, as more industries located along the line, and earnings were strong enough for the company to declare dividends in 1930 and 1931. The Ma and Pa's relative prosperity ended with the economic downturn during the Great Depression, which cut the railroad's gross revenues by half from 1932 to 1935.

In the mid-1930s, the Ma and Pa became an early favorite of railfans, attracted by its hilly, curving line through rural Maryland and Pennsylvania. The railroad offered several popular fan excursions pulled by its elderly steam locomotives.

Following the end of World War II, the Ma and Pa acquired four diesel locomotives for more economical operations, but traffic declined significantly. When the Ma and Pa's mail contract was cancelled by the U.S. postal service, the railroad discontinued all passenger service on August 31, 1954. One person on the last passenger train recalled that many riders came from as far away as Boston, Massachusetts, and Washington, D.C., to participate in the historic event, along with members of the National Railway Historical Society. The picturesque line's last steam engine dropped its fire for the final time on November 29, 1956.

The lack of traffic on the railroad's  Baltimore–Whiteford Maryland Division in the 1950s was particularly acute. One of the last major shipments to occur was Indiana limestone for the construction of Baltimore's Cathedral of Mary Our Queen in 1956. The Baltimore–Whiteford segment in Maryland was finally abandoned altogether on June 11, 1958, leaving only the stone abutments where the tracks crossed York Road in Towson on a steel girder bridge. A local group of history buffs placed a bronze plaque on the west abutment in 1999, commemorating the departed railroad's place in Towson history.

In the 1960s, the Ma and Pa Railroad continued to solicit business along its line for its remaining  Whiteford–York segment, almost entirely in Pennsylvania. In 1971, the Maryland and Pennsylvania Railroad was acquired by Emons Industries. Primarily hauling slate from a quarry at Delta, and furniture from a factory in Red Lion, the Ma and Pa's Pennsylvania Division continued in operation until June 14, 1978, when the line was further reduced to the  York–Red Lion section. The Red Lion freight station was closed on November 1, 1980;  when the Pennsylvania town's furniture manufacturer shuttered its doors in 1984, the Red Lion section of the railroad was also abandoned.

Currently

The Emons-controlled Maryland and Pennsylvania Railroad acquired  of a former PRR branch line between York and Hanover, Pennsylvania in 1976 from Penn Central. In December 1999, Emons merged its M&P subsidiary with another area short-line, Yorkrail, forming the York Railway. In 2002, Genesee and Wyoming gained control of the  York Railway, including the former M&P Railroad trackage between York–Hanover. The York Railway currently serves 40 online rail customers and connects with the Norfolk Southern and CSX railroads. Most of the former PRR Hanover branch between the village of Bair and Hanover is now out-of-service, but a small portion is still used to serve a BAE Systems factory in Bair occasionally. The out-of-service section from Bair to Hanover will be removed sometime in 2021 to become a rail trail.

A small,  fragment of the original railroad line still exists between Laurel and Muddy Creek Forks in York County, Pennsylvania, maintained by the Maryland and Pennsylvania Railroad Preservation Society. Founded by enthusiasts and former employees in 1986, the group has restored the Muddy Creek Forks station and also has a small collection of rolling stock there. The preserved Red Lion, Pennsylvania, station is now a museum operated by the Red Lion Area Historical Society. Other remaining structures along the old right-of-way include scattered bridge abutments and some station buildings, such as the former combination railroad station and general store in the village of Hydes, Maryland.   Another Maryland station, at Glen Arm, still stands. Built in 1909, it was designated by the Baltimore County Council on August 5, 2019, as a protected historical landmark. A  section of the Ma and Pa's old right-of-way was converted in 1998 to a rail trail in Harford County, Maryland. Now designated the Ma & Pa Heritage Trail, it goes through Bel Air and is used for hiking and biking.
 
In Baltimore, near Pennsylvania Station, Ma and Pa track remnants and the old roundhouse, freight shed, and yard shed are still extant. The Baltimore Streetcar Museum now operates in this area.

In York County, the Muddy Creek Bridge, Delta Trestle Bridge, and Scott Creek Bridge-North were added to the National Register of Historic Places in 1995.

See also
"Ma and Pa" Railroad in Towson, Md.

References

External links

York Railway, official Genesee and Wyoming website
The Maryland and Pennsylvania Railroad Historical Society
Ma & Pa Railroad and the Falls Road Roundhouse (Baltimore Heritage website)
The History of the Ma & Pa Trail (Ma & Pa Heritage Trail website)
Ma & Pa Railroad Heritage Village
Film of steam-powered excursion train on the Ma & Pa, powered by Canadian Pacific 4-6-2 engine #1286.

Defunct Maryland railroads
Pennsylvania railroads
Genesee & Wyoming
Railway companies established in 1901
Non-operating common carrier freight railroads in the United States
Transportation in York County, Pennsylvania
Defunct Pennsylvania railroads